Esmail Kandi (also Romanized as Esmā‘īl Kandī; also known as Esmā‘īl Khān-e Jelodār and Qeshlāq-e Esmā‘īl Khān) is a village in Mahmudabad Rural District, Tazeh Kand District, Parsabad County, Ardabil Province, Iran. At the 2006 census, its population was 926, in 197 families.

References 

Towns and villages in Parsabad County